Holger Nielsen (1866–1955) was a Danish fencer, shooter, and athlete.

Holger Nielsen may also refer to:

 Holger Bech Nielsen, Danish physicist
 Holger K. Nielsen, Danish politician
 Holger Marius Nielsen, Danish education official
 The Holger Nielsen method of artificial respiration